Traps is a 1985 Australian film directed by John Hughes.

It screened at the Melbourne International Film Festival.

References

External links
Traps page at Art Films
Traps at IMDb
Traps at Oz Movies

Australian drama films
1985 films
1985 drama films
1980s Australian films